In algebraic geometry, given a pair (X, D) consisting of a normal variety X and a -divisor D on X (e.g., canonical divisor), the discrepancy of the pair (X, D) measures the degree of the singularity of the pair.

See also 
 Canonical singularity
Crepant resolution

References 
 

Algebraic geometry